Alfred Graham Whitehead (born in Harrogate, 15 April 1922 – died in Lower Basildon, Berkshire, 15 January 1981) was a British racing driver from England. He participated in one Formula One World Championship Grand Prix, on 19 July 1952. He finished 12th, scoring no championship points. He also competed in several non-Championship Formula One races. He began racing his half-brother Peter's ERA, in 1951 and then drove his Formula Two Alta in the 1952 British Grand Prix. He finished second at 1958 24 Hours of Le Mans only weeks before the accident on the Tour de France in which Peter was killed. Graham escaped serious injury and later raced again with an Aston Martin and Ferrari 250GT before stopping at the end of 1961.

Graham finished second in the first Goodwood Nine Hours race in 1952 co driving American Tom Cole's Ferrari.

Racing record

Career highlights

Complete Formula One World Championship results
(key)

Complete 24 Hours of Le Mans results

Complete 12 Hours of Reims results

Complete 12 Hours of Hyères results

Complete 12 Hours of Casablanca results

References

1922 births
1981 deaths
Sportspeople from Harrogate
English racing drivers
English Formula One drivers
Racing drivers from Yorkshire
24 Hours of Le Mans drivers
12 Hours of Reims drivers
World Sportscar Championship drivers